Land of the Crimson Dawn is the seventh full-length album by the German power metal band Freedom Call. It was released on February 24, 2012 via SPV in Germany, the Europe-wide release on February 27, and the North American release on February 28. The album was released in three versions: as a jewel case featuring 14 songs, as a double coloured vinyl LP and as a limited edition double CD digipak including six additional Freedom Call covers.

Track list
All music and lyrics by Chris Bay, except tracks 1 and 11 music and lyrics by Lars Rettkowitz and track 13: music and lyrics by Samy Saemann.

Credits
Chris Bay – vocals, guitar, keyboards
Lars Rettkowitz – guitar, backing vocals
Samy Saemann – bass guitar, backing vocals
Klaus Sperling – drums, backing vocals

References

External links
 Official Freedom Call Website
  Hero on Video from Land of the Crimson Dawn (official) 

Freedom Call albums
2012 albums
SPV/Steamhammer albums